The Kansas Avenue Bridge (West) is a four lane, multi-beam girder bridge crossing the Kansas River, and a small company on the east side.
It was first built in 1916 as a 9 span thru-truss, but later in 1988 destroyed, and replaced with the current multi-beam girder bridge.
It is just west of the 18th Street Expressway Bridge.

Bridges over the Kansas River
Bridges in Kansas City, Kansas
Bridges completed in 1916
Bridges completed in 1988
Road bridges in Kansas
Girder bridges in the United States